The Association of Issuing Bodies (AIB) promotes the use of a standardised system, based on harmonized environment, structures, and procedures to ensure the reliable operation of international energy certificate systems. The standardized system is known as the European Energy Certificate System (EECS) and is set out in "The EECS Rules" and its supporting documents.

Of the 28 countries of the European Union, 18 are now active members of the AIB, along with Norway and Switzerland. Since 2001, more than three billion (3,232 million) 1MWh certificates have been issued, of which 2,859 million have already been used (cancelled) to guarantee to consumers the origin of the renewable energy they have purchased. In 2016, more than 531 million certificates were issued, and 387 million of these were cancelled.

The work of the AIB is relevant to all electricity customers, as the Guarantee of Origin (the instrument created in the European Directive and standardised through EECS) is a cornerstone of providing reliable disclosure information on the origin of electricity supplied to consumers.

Footnotes 

International organizations based in Europe
International energy organizations